Saeed Hosseinpour (born 12 October 1998) is an Iranian professional footballer who plays as a midfielder.

Club career

Persepolis
Hosseinpour joined Persepolis in summer 2017 with a contract until 2021. He made his professional debut for Persepolis on August 3, 2018 in 3-0 Win against Foolad as a substitute for Omid Alishah.

Career statistics

Club

Honours
Persepolis
Persian Gulf Pro League (3): 2017–18, 2018–19, 2019–20
Iranian Super Cup (2): 2018,  2019
Hazfi Cup (1): 2018–19
AFC Champions League runner-up: 2018, 2020

References

External links
 Soccerway.com Profile
 Saeed Hosseinpour at IranLeague.ir
 Saeed Hosseinpour at Instagram

1998 births
Living people
Iranian footballers
People from Amol
Paykan F.C. players
Persepolis F.C. players
Persian Gulf Pro League players
Association football midfielders
Sportspeople from Mazandaran province